The 41 Squadron Airborne is an independent special operations force of the Bangladesh Air Force. This commando unit was formed to protect the country’s air bases, aircraft and other air force installations and assets. It operates a small commando unit mainly for safeguarding the airport areas but they can perform basic duties as well.

History 
It has a training center in Gazipur, Dhaka. These commandos are also experts in Crashed Pilot Rescue, Behind Enemy Lines Operations, Counter Terrorism/Counter Insurgency. The commandos of this force usually use Type-56-2, BD-08, Taurus SMT-9C SMG,12 Gauge shotguns, VariousLMG, Type-85 sniper rifle and so on.

References 

Special forces of Bangladesh
Military units and formations of Bangladesh